An election for Governor of Lagos State took place on 11 April 2015. All Progressives Congress (APC) candidate Akinwunmi Ambode, who is a former accountant general of Lagos State, defeated People's Democratic Party (PDP) candidate Jimi Agbaje and Alliance for Democracy (AD) candidate Bolaji Ogunseye. The governor and deputy governor are elected on the same ticket.

APC primary
APC candidate Akinwunmi Ambode defeated 12 other contestants to clinch the party ticket. He won with 3,735 votes to defeat his closest rival, Obafemi Hamzat (who received 1,201 votes), and Speaker of the Lagos State House of Assembly Adeyemi Ikuforiji, who came in a distant third with 182 votes.

Candidates
Akinwunmi Ambode
Obafemi Hamzat
Adeyemi Ikuforiji
Supo Shasore 
Ganiyu Olanrewaju Solomon
Lekan Pitan
Tola Kasali
Tokunbo Agbesanwa
Abayomi Sutton
Adekunle Disu
Tokunbo Wahab
Lanre Ope

Results

PDP primary

Candidates
 Jimi Agbaje
 Musiliu Obanikoro
 Tokunbo Kamson
 Deji Doherty
 Babatunde Gbadamosi

Results

General election

Results

See also
Nigerian National Assembly election, 2015 (Lagos State)

References

Lagos State gubernatorial elections
Lagos State gubernatorial election
April 2015 events in Nigeria
2015 Lagos State elections
2015 politics in Lagos State